Cheetah Racing Cars was a prolific Australian manufacturer of race cars. The cars were almost solely designed, engineered and constructed by Brian Shead in a small factory at the rear of his home in Mordialloc, a suburb of Melbourne, Australia.

History
The first Cheetah was built for Shead's personal use in 1960. It was a 'Cooper Copy' built to race in Formula Junior. A second Cheetah was built in 1962 and third in 1963. A completely new design was commenced in 1970, after which a friend (Don Biggar) persuaded Shead to construct an additional car, Mk4H Hill-climb car powered by an Oldsmobile V8 engine. By 1973 Shead gave up his usual job to design and build race cars full-time. The final car was produced in 1989, being a Mk9 for use in Formula Holden. Cars were constructed for Formula Junior, Formula Libre, Hillclimbing, Australian Formula 3 (AF3), Australian Formula 2 (AF2), Australian Formula 1 (AF1 or Formula Atlantic or Formula Pacific) and Formula Holden. Cheetah Race Cars dominated Formula Three during the 1970s and in Australian Formula 2 they were the dominant manufacturer during the late 1970s and most of the 1980s. In Formula Holden, the sole Cheetah built for the category in 1989 was still competitive in the mid-1990s against far newer carbon fibre cars built by Ralt and Reynard.

Brian Shead also built one car that was not an open wheeler, being a Cheetah Clubman built for the Sports 1300 racing category. It was raced by Peter Jones, winning 132 races, including seven New South Wales titles and three Victorian titles.

Cheetah race cars are common sights at Australian historic race meetings, hill climbs, sprints and in Australian Formula 2 and Formula-R. In the latter two categories, Cheetah Mk7 and Mk8s which were built in the late 1970s and early 1980s are still winning races and championships against far newer carbon fibre tubbed Dallara and Reynard Motorsport cars.

Although Cheetahs are no longer manufactured, Shead is still actively involved with Cheetah race cars, supplying parts and advice to Cheetah owners.

Models

Championships & Series

Lap Records

References
 Australian Motor Racing Yearbook 1985/86 Number 15 (1986)
 Australian Motor Racing 1982 Number 1
Australian Formula 2 Club Inc.

External links
 CAMS website
 www.formula-robertson.com
In car footage of a Mk7 doing a Hillclimb
www.oldracingcars.com

Australian racecar constructors
Formula Two constructors